Harbour Plaza Hotel Management is a hospitality management company in Hong Kong. It is owned by Cheung Kong Property Holdings.

The company currently manages 9 hotels in Hong Kong alone, China and the Bahamas, including Harbour Plaza Resort City, Harbour Plaza North Point, Harbour Plaza Metropolis, Kowloon Hotel and the other two luxury hotels Harbour Grand Hong Kong and Harbour Grand Kowloon in Hong Kong. Others included Harbour Plaza Chongqing in Mainland China, and Our Lucaya in the Bahamas.

Hong Kong
 Harbour Plaza Resort City, Tin Shui Wai
 Harbour Plaza, North Point
 Harbour Plaza Metropolis, Hung Hom
 Harbour Plaza 8 Degrees, To Kwa Wan, Kowloon
 Kowloon Hotel, Tsim Sha Tsui
 Harbour Grand Hong Kong, Fortress Hill 
 Harbour Grand Kowloon, Whampoa Garden

2009

In June 2009, Harbour Plaza opened a new five star property – Harbour Grand Hong Kong. Another new property Harbour Plaza 8 Degrees was scheduled to open in October 2009.

2010
In 2010, Harbour Plaza Hong Kong was rebranded as Harbour Grand Kowloon. There are two Harbour Grand hotels in the city, with one on Kowloon side and the other on Hong Kong Island.

Gallery

See also
 Sheraton Hong Kong
 Hilton Hong Kong

References

Hong Kong brands
Hospitality companies established in 2003
Joint ventures
CK Hutchison Holdings
Hospitality companies of Hong Kong
Hotel chains in China
2003 establishments in Hong Kong